Macrophoma theicola is a plant pathogen affecting Camellia sinensis, the tea plant, which is capable of reducing yields or killing plants altogether. Early symptoms include the browning and drooping of leaves. It is spread most easily in wet, rainy conditions.

References

External links

Botryosphaeriaceae
Fungal plant pathogens and diseases
Tea diseases